Viktor Hennadiyovych Dvirnyk (born 28 February 1969) is a Ukrainian retired professional footballer who played for several clubs in Europe.

Club career
Dvirnyk played for Sparta Prague and Bohemians 1905 in the Czech Gambrinus liga,
a brief spell in the Slovak Premier League during the 1994–95 season and played for AEL Larissa in the Greek Super League during the 1995–96 season. He finished his career in the Croatian First League with NK Mladost 127 and NK Istra.

References

External links
 

1969 births
Living people
Footballers from Kyiv
Soviet footballers
Ukrainian footballers
Association football forwards
FC Dynamo Kyiv players
FC Ros Bila Tserkva players
MFC Mykolaiv players
ŠK Futura Humenné players
FK Inter Bratislava players
AC Sparta Prague players
Bohemians 1905 players
Athlitiki Enosi Larissa F.C. players
HNK Suhopolje players
NK Istra players
Soviet Second League players
Slovak National Football League players
Czechoslovak First League players
Czech First League players
Slovak Super Liga players
Czech National Football League players
Super League Greece players
Bohemian Football League players
Croatian Football League players
Soviet expatriate footballers
Expatriate footballers in Czechoslovakia
Soviet expatriate sportspeople in Czechoslovakia
Ukrainian expatriate footballers
Ukrainian expatriate sportspeople in Czechoslovakia
Expatriate footballers in the Czech Republic
Expatriate footballers in Slovakia
Expatriate footballers in Greece
Expatriate footballers in Croatia
Ukrainian expatriate sportspeople in the Czech Republic
Ukrainian expatriate sportspeople in Slovakia
Ukrainian expatriate sportspeople in Greece
Ukrainian expatriate sportspeople in Croatia